Gentleman Joe is a 1910 American film. It stars Harry Carey in his second onscreen role.

See also
 List of American films of 1910
 1910 in film
 Harry Carey filmography

External links

1910 films
1910 short films
American silent short films
American black-and-white films
1910s American films